Sandoval is a surname of Spanish origin.

Sandoval may also refer to:

Places
Sandoval County, New Mexico, United States
Sandoval Township, Marion County, Illinois, United States
Sandoval, Illinois, United States, a village
Sandoval, Texas, United States, a census-designated place
Lake Sandoval, Peru

Naval vessels
USS Sandoval (1895), an Alvarado-class patrol boat
USS Sandoval (APA-194), a Haskell-class attack transport

See also

 
 Alexander v. Sandoval, a 2001 U.S. Supreme Court case deciding on disparate impact private suits
 United States v. Sandoval, a 1913 U.S. Supreme Court case deciding that the federal Congress had to right to govern U.S. Native American Indians and not the states